Eresina bergeri is a butterfly in the family Lycaenidae. It is found in the Democratic Republic of the Congo (Lualaba), Uganda, north-western Tanzania and possibly the Republic of the Congo. Its habitat consists of dense, primary forests.

References

Butterflies described in 1956
Poritiinae